Bill Lacey (born July 27, 1971) is a former American football player and coach. He served as the head football coach at Sacred Heart University from 2002 to 2003, compiling a record of record of 13–8.

Head coaching record

References

1971 births
Living people
American football offensive tackles
Bates Bobcats football coaches
Sacred Heart Pioneers football coaches
Villanova Wildcats football coaches
Villanova Wildcats football players
Wagner Seahawks football coaches
People from Monroe County, Pennsylvania
Sportspeople from Bridgeport, Connecticut